In October 2015, Marvel Comics relaunched their entire line of publications, dubbing the new publishing initiative as the All-New, All-Different Marvel. The initiative consisted of a new imprint of titles in a rebooted Marvel Universe post-"Secret Wars".

In October 2016, following the events of Civil War II, Marvel launched another publishing initiative called "Marvel NOW 2.0", although the continuity continued to exist under the new initiative. New titles were launched while some titles under the "All-New, All-Different Marvel" initiative were rebranded but retained their numbering.

In March 2017, various titles from the X-Men and Inhumans communities are relaunched and rebranded, as well as new titles being added, as an aftermath of Inhumans vs. X-Men. This initiative was called "ResurrXion".

This list contains all titles released by Marvel Comics that are related to its "All-New, All-Different Marvel" relaunch.

Titles
{| class="wikitable collapsible" style="text-align:center; border:2px solid #a3b1bf; font-weight:normal; width:99%;"
|-
! style="background:#cee0f2;" |

All-New, All-Different Marvel
|-
! colspan="4" style="background:#f5faff;" | 
{| class="wikitable collapsible sortable" style="text-align:center; border:2px solid #cee0f2; font-weight:normal; width:99%;"
|-  
! colspan="4" style="background:#f5faff;" |

Current on-going series / volumes
|-
! scope="col" style="text-align:center; width:15%; background:#e6f2ff;" | Title
! scope="col" style="text-align:center; width:15%; background:#e6f2ff;" | Publication Date
! scope="col" style="text-align:center; width:15%; background:#e6f2ff;" | Initial Creative Team
! scope="col" style="text-align:center; width:30%; background:#e6f2ff;" | Notes / References
|-
! All-New Wolverine(rebranded in ResurrXion)
| November 2015 – present
| WriterTom TaylorArtistDavid Lopez
| style="text-align:left;"|
|-
! Amazing Spider-Man
| October 2015 – present
| WriterDan SlottArtistGiuseppe Camuncoli
| style="text-align:left;"|
|-
! Captain America: Sam Wilson
| October 2015 – present
| WriterNick SpencerArtistDaniel Acuña
| style="text-align:left;"|
|-
! Daredevil(rebranded in Marvel NOW 2.0)
| December 2015 – present
| WriterCharles SouleArtistRon Garney
| style="text-align:left;"|
|-
! Deadpool(rebranded in Marvel NOW 2.0)
| November 2015 – present
| WriterGerry DugganArtistMike Hawthorne
| style="text-align:left;"|
|-
! Doctor Strange
| October 2015 – present
| WriterJason AaronArtistChris Bachalo
| style="text-align:left;"|
|-
! Mighty Thor(rebranded in Marvel NOW 2.0)
| November 2015 – present
| WriterJason AaronArtistRussell Dauterman
| style="text-align:left;"|
|-
! Moon Girl and Devil Dinosaur(rebranded in Marvel NOW 2.0)
| November 2015 – present
| WriterAmy Reeder and Brandon MontclareArtistNatacha Bustos
| style="text-align:left;"|
|-
! Ms. Marvel(rebranded in Marvel NOW 2.0)
| November 2015 – present
| WriterG. Willow WilsonArtistTakeshi Miyazawa and Adrian Alphona
| style="text-align:left;"|
|-
! Silk
| November 2015 – present
| WriterRobbie ThompsonArtistStacey Lee
| style="text-align:left;"|
|-
! Spider-Gwen
| October 2015 – present
| WriterJason LatourArtistRobbi Rodriguez
| style="text-align:left;"|
|-
! Spider-Man 2099
| October 2015 – present
| WriterPeter DavidArtistWill Sliney
| style="text-align:left;"|
|-
! Unbeatable Squirrel Girl
| October 2015 – present
| WriterRyan NorthArtistErica Henderson
| style="text-align:left;"|
|-
! Uncanny Avengers(rebranded in Marvel NOW 2.0)
| October 2015 – present
| WriterGerry DugganArtistRyan Stegman
| style="text-align:left;"|

|-  
! colspan="4" style="background:#f5faff;" |

Discontinued series / volumes
|-
! scope="col" style="text-align:center; width:15%; background:#e6f2ff;" | Title
! scope="col" style="text-align:center; width:15%; background:#e6f2ff;" | Publication Date
! scope="col" style="text-align:center; width:15%; background:#e6f2ff;" | Initial Creative Team
! scope="col" style="text-align:center; width:30%; background:#e6f2ff;" | Notes / References
|-
! All-New, All-Different Avengers
| November 2015 – October 2016(1-15)
| WriterMark WaidArtistMahmud Asrar and Adam Kubert
| style="text-align:left;"|
|-
! All-New Hawkeye
| November 2015 – April 2016(1-6)
| WriterJeff LemireArtistRamon Perez
| style="text-align:left;"|
|-
! All-New Inhumans
| December 2015 – September 2016(1-11)
| WriterCharles Soule and James AsmusArtistStefano Caselli
| style="text-align:left;"|
|-
! All-New X-Men
| December 2015 – March 2017(1-19)
| WriterDennis HopelessArtistMark Bagley
| style="text-align:left;"|
|-
! Angela: Queen of Hel
| October 2015 – April 2016(1-7)
| WriterMarguerite BennettArtistKim Jacinto and Stephanie Han
| style="text-align:left;"|
|-
! Astonishing Ant-Man
| October 2015 – October 2016(1-13)
| WriterNick SpencerArtistRamon Rosanas
| style="text-align:left;"|
|-
! Black Knight
| November 2015 – March 2016(1-5)
| WriterFrank TieriArtistLuca Pizzari
| style="text-align:left;"|
|-
! Carnage
| November 2015 – January 2017(1-16)
| WriterGerry ConwayArtistMike Perkins
| style="text-align:left;"|
|-
! Contest of Champions
| October 2015 – July 2016(1-10)
| WriterAl EwingArtistPaco Medina
| style="text-align:left;"|
|-
! Drax
| November 2015 – September 2016(1-11)
| WriterAl EwingArtistPaco Medina
| style="text-align:left;"|
|-
! Extraordinary X-Men
| November 2015 – March 2017(1-20)
| WriterJeff LemireArtistHumberto Ramos
| style="text-align:left;"|
|-
! Guardians of the Galaxy(rebranded in Marvel NOW 2.0)
| October 2015 – April 2017(1-19)
| WriterBrian Michael BendisArtistValerio Schitti
| style="text-align:left;"|
|-
! Hercules
| November 2015 – April 2016(1-6)
| WriterDan AbnettArtistLuke Ross
| style="text-align:left;"|
|-
! Howard the Duck
| November 2015 – October 2016(1-11)
| WriterChip ZdarskyArtistJoe Quinones
| style="text-align:left;"|
|-
! Howling Commandos of S.H.I.E.L.D
| October 2015 – March 2016(1-6)
| WriterFrank BarbiereArtistBrent Schoonover
| style="text-align:left;"|
|-
! Illuminati
| November 2015 – May 2016(1-7)
| WriterJosh WilliamsonArtistShawn Crystal
| style="text-align:left;"|
|-
! Invincible Iron Man
| October 2015 – October 2016(1-14)
| WriterBrian Michael BendisArtistDavid Marquez
| style="text-align:left;"|
|-
! Karnak
| October 2015 – February 2017(1-6)
| WriterWarren EllisArtistGerardo Zaffino
| style="text-align:left;"|
|-
! New Avengers
| October 2015 – November 2016(1-18)
| WriterAl EwingArtistGerardo Sandoval
| style="text-align:left;"|
|-
! Nova(relaunched in Marvel NOW 2.0)
| November 2015 – September 2016(1-18)
| WriterSean RyanArtistCory Smith
| style="text-align:left;"|
|-
! Spider-Woman(relaunched in Marvel NOW 2.0)
| November 2015 – March 2017(1-17)
| WriterDennis HopelessArtistJavier Rodriguez
| style="text-align:left;"|
|-
! Star-Lord
| November 2015 – June 2016(1-8)
| WriterSam HumphriesArtistJavier Garron
| style="text-align:left;"|
|-
! Ultimates
| November 2015 – October 2016(1-12)
| WriterAl EwingArtistKenneth Rocafort
| style="text-align:left;"|
|-
! Uncanny Inhumans
| October 2015 – March 2017(1-20)
| WriterCharles SouleArtistSteve McNiven
| style="text-align:left;"|
|-
! Venom: Spaceknight
| November 2015 – October 2016(1-13)
| WriterRobbie ThompsonArtistAriel Olivetti
| style="text-align:left;"|
|-
! Vision
| November 2015 – October 2016(1-12)
| WriterTom KingArtistGabriel Hernandez Walta
| style="text-align:left;"|
|-
! Web Warriors
| November 2015 – September 2016(1-11)
| WriterMike CostaArtistDavid Bildeon
| style="text-align:left;"|

|-  
! colspan="4" style="background:#f5faff;" |

One-shots
|-
! scope="col" style="text-align:center; width:15%; background:#e6f2ff;" | Title
! scope="col" style="text-align:center; width:15%; background:#e6f2ff;" | Publication Date
! scope="col" style="text-align:center; width:15%; background:#e6f2ff;" | Initial Creative Team
! scope="col" style="text-align:center; width:30%; background:#e6f2ff;" | Notes / References
|-
! All-New, All-Different Point One
| October 2016
| WritervariousArtistvarious
| style="text-align:left;"|
|-
! Avengers
| October 2016
| WritervariousArtistvarious
| style="text-align:left;"|

Marvel Comics-related lists
Lists of comics by Marvel Comics
Superhero comics